The Meaning of Relativity: Four Lectures Delivered at Princeton University, May 1921 is a book published by Princeton University Press in 1922 that compiled the 1921 Stafford Little Lectures at Princeton University, given by Albert Einstein. The lectures were translated into English by Edwin Plimpton Adams. The lectures and the subsequent book were Einstein's last attempt to provide a comprehensive overview of his theory of relativity and is his only book that provides an accessible overview of the physics and mathematics of general relativity. Einstein explained his goal in the preface of the book's German edition by stating he "wanted to summarize the principal thoughts and mathematical methods of relativity theory" and that his "principal aim was to let the fundamentals in the entire train of thought of the theory emerge clearly". Among other reviews, the lectures were the subject of the 2017 book The Formative Years of Relativity: The History and Meaning of Einstein's Princeton Lectures by Hanoch Gutfreund and Jürgen Renn.

Background 

The book contains four of Einstein's Stafford Little Lectures that were given at Princeton University in 1921. The lectures follow a series of 1915 publications by Einstein developing the theory of general relativity. During this time, there were still many controversial issues surrounding the theories and he was still defending several of his views. The lectures and the subsequent book were Einstein's last attempt to provide a comprehensive overview of his theory of relativity. It is also his only book that provides an overview of the physics and mathematics of general relativity in a comprehensive manner that was accessible to non-specialists. Einstein explained his goal in the preface of the book's German edition by stating he "wanted to summarize the principal thoughts and mathematical methods of relativity theory" and that his "principal aim was to let the fundamentals in the entire train of thought of the theory emerge clearly".

On December 27, 1949, The New York Times ran a story titled "New Einstein theory gives a master key to the universe" in reaction to the new appendix in the book's fifth edition in which Einstein expounded upon his latest unification efforts. Einstein had nothing to do with the article and subsequently refused to speak with any reporters on the matter; he reportedly used the message "[c]ome back and see me in twenty years" to brush off their inquiries.

Content 
The book is made of four lectures. The first is titled "Space and Time in Pre-Relativity Physics". The second lecture is titled The Theory of Special Relativity and discusses the special theory of relativity. The third and fourth lectures cover the general theory of relativity in two parts. Einstein added an appendix to update the book for its second edition, which published in 1945. A second appendix was later added for the fifth edition as well, in 1955, which discusses the nonsymmetric field. The second appendix contains Einstein's attempts at a unified field theory.

Reception 
The book has received many reviews since its initial publication. The first edition of the book was reviewed by Nature in 1923. Other early versions of the book were reviewed by George Yuri Rainich in 1946, as well as Abraham H. Taub, Philip Morrison, and I. M. Levitt in 1950. Reviews for the book's fifth edition include a short announcement in 1955 that called the book "a well-known classic". A 1956 review of the fifth edition summarizes its publication history and contents and closes by stating "Einstein's little book then serves as an excellent tying-together of loose ends and as a broad survey of the subject."

Among other references to the book, a 2005 column of The Physics Teacher, included the work in a list of books "by and about Einstein that all physics teachers should have" and "should have immediate access to", while a 2019 review of another work opened by stating: "Every teacher of General Relativity depends heavily on two texts: one, the massive ‘Gravitation’ by Misner, Thorne and Wheeler, the second the diminutive ‘The Meaning of Relativity’ by Einstein." The Meaning of Relativity is the focus of a 2017 book, The Formative Years of Relativity by Hanoch Gutfreund and Jürgen Renn, which described The Meaning of Relativity as "Einstein's definitive exposition of his special and general theories of relativity".

Publication history

Original English editions

Notable reprints

German editions

See also 

 List of scientific publications by Albert Einstein
 Annus Mirabilis papers
 History of general relativity
 History of special relativity

References

Further reading

External links 

The Meaning of Relativity 5th edition at Princeton University Press
The Meaning of Relativity 5th edition at JSTOR
The Meaning of Relativity at Springer Link 
An insightful tome recounts the heady early days of general relativity review by Andrew Robinson at sciencemag.org

1922 non-fiction books
Physics books
Theory of relativity
Works by Albert Einstein
Princeton University Press books